The 1913 Dartmouth football team represented Dartmouth College in the 1913 college football season. They finished with a 7–1 record and outscored their opponents 218 to 79. The season marked its third with coach Frank Cavanaugh, who hired Jogger Elcock and Wesley Englehorn as assistants for the year. Englehorn was originally elected as team captain, but was then considered eligible to play. Thus, Robert Hogsett was selected as team captain.

Schedule

References

Dartmouth
Dartmouth Big Green football seasons
Dartmouth football